Moradbeygi-ye Khalaf (also Romanized as Morādbeygī-ye Khalaf; also known as Morādbeygī-ye Kūchek) is a village in Howmeh-ye Gharbi Rural District in the Central District of Ramhormoz County, Khuzestan Province, Iran. It was listed in the 2006 census, but its population was not reported.

References 

Populated places in Ramhormoz County